Minami-Alps Akaishi Onsen Shirakaba-so is the site of a hot spring, located in Shizuoka City in Shizuoka Prefecture.

References

Shizuoka (city)
Hot springs of Shizuoka Prefecture